The 2nd Iowa Cavalry Regiment was a cavalry regiment that served in the Union Army during the American Civil War.

Service
The 2nd Iowa Cavalry was organized at Davenport, Iowa and mustered in at Camp Joe Holt for three years of Federal service between August 30 and September 28, 1861.  
Among other engagements, the Regiment took part in Grierson's Raid through Mississippi in April 1863, being detached from the main column (6th and 7th Illinois Cavalry) after a few days to decoy the Confederate pursuit. They engaged the 2nd/22nd Tennessee Cavalry (Barteau's) at Palo Alto, Mississippi on April 21 and 22, 1863 and reported six missing after the skirmish.
The regiment was mustered out of Federal service on September 19, 1865.

Total strength and casualties
A total of 2053 men served in the 2nd Iowa at one time or another during its existence.
It suffered a total of 269 (275?) fatalities: 1 officer and 59 enlisted men who were killed in action or who died of their wounds;  8 officers and 207 enlisted men who died of disease.

Commanders
Colonel Washington L. Elliott
Colonel Edward Hatch
Colonel Datus E. Coon

See also
List of Iowa Civil War Units
Iowa in the American Civil War

Notes

References
The Civil War Archive

Units and formations of the Union Army from Iowa
1861 establishments in Iowa
Military units and formations established in 1861
Military units and formations disestablished in 1865